Akashi (written: 明石) is a Japanese surname. Notable people with the surname include:

Kaijin Akashi (1901–1939), poet
Ken Akashi (born 1976), race walker
Momoka Akashi, musician
Akashi Morishige (1566–1618?), samurai
Akashi Motojiro (1864 – 26 October 1919), general and Governor General of Japan
Akashi Shiganosuke (c. 1600 – c. 1649), sumo wrestler
Yasushi Akashi (born 1931), diplomat

Fictional characters:
 Akashi Kaoru, character in Psychic Squad
 Akashi, character in the film Ra.One
Akashi Seijūrō, character in Kuroko's Basketball
Akashi Yuuna, character in Negima! Magister Negi Magi
Akaashi Keiji, character in Haikyu!! 
Akashi Takeomi, character in Tokyo Revengers  

Japanese-language surnames